Emmanuel Lemelson (born Gregory Manoli Lemelson, June 29, 1976) is an American-born Greek Orthodox priest, social commentator and hedge fund manager.

Between 1999 and 2010, he ran the internet company Amvona. In 2011, Lemelson was ordained a Greek Orthodox priest. In 2012, he founded Lemelson Capital Management, which runs The Amvona Fund, a hedge fund based on Christian ethics. In September 2018, Lemelson was sued by the U.S. Securities and Exchange Commission for various infractions involving a short sale. A federal jury returned a mixed verdict resulting in a fine and 5-year injunction barring Lemelson from further securities violations.

Early life and education
Gregory Manoli Lemelson was born on June 29, 1976, in Phoenix, Arizona to a Jewish father and Christian mother. Following high school, he attended Seattle University, graduating with a Bachelor of Arts in Theology and Religious Studies in 1999. He then attended Hellenic College Holy Cross Greek Orthodox School of Theology in Brookline, Massachusetts, where he received a M.Div. in 2003.

While a 17-year-old undergraduate at Seattle University, Lemelson met Robert Spitzer, a Jesuit priest and philosopher. In interviews, Lemelson has indicated that the encounter was a significant event in his religious life.

Early career
Lemelson has written about his early business experiences, saying that his earliest recollection was selling candy on the bus ride home from school in the sixth grade. In 1994, while an undergraduate student at Seattle University, he launched a retail photography business, and in 1999 he founded the website Amvona (a name derived from the Greek word for "pulpit") from his dorm room at Hellenic College. The company, which sold photography accessories, grew quickly, generating around $40 million in revenue.
 
In 2005, based in part on proprietary software the company developed, the site began a transition to a hybrid platform of social networking and ecommerce content. By 2007, Lemelson developed technology to link media creation to relevant products using exif data and aggregating shared images of the site's users as a prototype first known as "Amvona Trails" and later rebranded as the independent website Flekt.

Between 1999 and 2010, Amvona sold more than a million photo accessories to 300,000 customers, and was one of the top ten most visited online photo retail websites. The company also registered several patents, including proprietary software to connect its customers through user profiles, product reviews, exit data and online tracking software. Similar technology was later used by other websites to track user activities. In 2010, Amvona discontinued its e-commerce business. There was no official explanation, however journalist Filipe R. Costa speculated it was due to increased competition from Chinese companies offering cheap photography equipment online, and Lemelson's business philosophy of not taking on massive debt for the possibility of future growth.

Lemelson later added a news and securities analysis content outlet for the site focused on issues of faith, technology, economics and investing.

Religious activity

Lemelson was ordained as a Greek Orthodox deacon on July 23, 2011, and, the following day, as a priest by Metropolitan Elpidophoros of Bursa. He was granted the ecclesiastical name Emmanuel and was assigned to the Albanian Orthodox Diocese of America at the Holy Trinity Albanian Orthodox parish in South Boston. In June 2013, he was assigned to the Holy Metropolis of Switzerland, a jurisdiction of the Ecumenical Patriarchate.

In November 2014, Lemelson was a member of the Orthodox Church's delegation for a two-day meeting between Ecumenical Patriarch Bartholomew I and Pope Francis in Istanbul. He has said that as a young man he fostered a vision that Catholics and Orthodox Christians would soon be reunited, and he has stated that more progress towards reconciliation has been made under these two leaders than had taken place in nearly a millennium, since the East–West Schism.  Lemelson also argued that the timing was "critical" since, as he claimed, "Christians are facing unprecedented persecution in our modern era."

At a presidential candidate campaign rally for Donald Trump held in Keene, New Hampshire on September 30, 2015, Lemelson offered the invocation and spoke at the rally, condemning the abortion practices of Planned Parenthood. He also gave a personal blessing to Trump.

In October 2016 Lemelson called for the removal of the chancellor of the Greek Orthodox Metropolis of Boston following a clergy sex-abuse scandal. He said the incident was preventable and there were serious deficiencies in the protocols used for the oversight of clergy.

Social commentary and media appearances
In 2010, Lemelson began to write about investment-related topics, including security analysis, Christian investment philosophy and ethics. For example, in a 2015 Fox Business video interview, he criticized the Federal Reserve for keeping interest rates artificially low and contributing to economic inequality, and in a June 2016 op-ed for The National Interest, he advocated strengthening of US immigration policy, which he claimed would oppose Islamic extremism.

In 2014 and 2015 Lemelson appeared on Benzinga, CBS Radio Boston, and on Fox News. He was briefly profiled on Russia's NTV in 2018.

Film 
In October 2015, Lemelson was featured in a documentary short produced by The Wall Street Journal and directed by Gabe Johnson and cinematographer Shiho Fukada.

In April 2021 Lemelson was featured in the documentary series Wahl Street for his role as a mentor to actor Mark Wahlberg. The series premiered on HBO Max to mixed reviews that were critical of the characters, including Lemelson. Executive producer Archie Gips later compared Lemelson to John Forbes Nash Jr.

Hedge fund manager

In 2012, Lemelson founded Lemelson Capital Management, LLC, the sole sponsor and general partner of The Amvona Fund, L.P. that focuses on deep value and special situations.

In 2014, he shorted the stock of World Wrestling Entertainment, questioning the value of the company's brand. and stating that he believed the company had made material misrepresentations about both its performance and operating model. When the share price subsequently fell, Lemelson went long the stock and called for new leadership or a sale of the company.

In late April, 2014 Lemelson announced he was building a stake in the semiconductor and LED equipment maker Kulicke & Soffa Industries (NASDAQ: KLIC), saying the company was "absurdly" undervalued. In a letter to the company's CEO Lemelson said he had amassed a stake of nearly 1% and planned to continue buying. Following his commentary, shares rose nearly 10% on triple the normal trading volume.

In June 2014, he shorted the stock of Ligand Pharmaceuticals, criticizing its business practices, drug Promacta, and relationship to Viking Therapeutics while publishing open letters to Congress regarding the alleged abuses. Lemelson's fund made $1.3 million when he covered the short position in October of the same year; by then, Ligand had lost $500 million of its market capitalization.  Company executives and congressmen Duncan Hunter later urged the SEC to charge Lemelson with a scheme to defraud investors.

Lemelson's activities led the Amvona Fund to be ranked in three months during 2013–14 among the world's top performing hedge funds, and by mid 2015 the company reported a net return of 150 percent since its launch.

His investment research and analysis has been cited in The Wall Street Journal, USA Today, New York Post,Fox Business Network and The Street, but has led to conflicting views, with The Motley Fool characterizing Lemelson as "especially harsh," while Benzinga compared his firm to Smith Barney.

In October 2015, The Wall Street Journal published an article about Lemelson that included a claim that he boasted of his ability to "crash" stocks and quoted him as saying "My whole life I always knew things before they happened. I guess it's just a gift from God". Lemelson later published a response to the story, calling it a "directory of fallacies," and outlined what he described as 14 major factual errors and omissions, but did not deny the quote regarding prescience. Dow Jones (the owner of The Wall Street Journal) stated that they stood by their story. 

In March 2016 Bloomberg, citing anonymous sources, published an article stating that the U.S. Securities and Exchange Commission (SEC) was examining whether Lemelson had spread false rumours about stocks. Lemelson called the article "irresponsible and libelous" and later sued Bloomberg. His complaint was eventually dismissed.

In September 2018 Lemelson was sued by the SEC for irregularities over his 2014 Ligand short sale. In November 2021, a federal jury returned a mixed verdict and in March 2022 Lemelson was fined and issued a five-year injunction barring him from further securities violations. The SEC intends to seek a lifetime ban to prevent Lemelson from working as an investment advisor.

Personal life
As of 2014 Lemelson was married to Theodora Anjeza Lemelson and lived in Southborough, Massachusetts. As of 2015, he had four children.

References

External links
 
 Amvona
 Lemelson Capital Management

1976 births
21st-century American businesspeople
21st-century Eastern Orthodox priests
American chief executives
American Eastern Orthodox priests
American finance and investment writers
American financial analysts
American hedge fund managers
American people of Jewish descent
Businesspeople from Massachusetts
Businesspeople from Phoenix, Arizona
Chief investment officers
Eastern Orthodox priests in the United States
Eastern Orthodox theologians
Greek Orthodox Christians from the United States
Hellenic College Holy Cross Greek Orthodox School of Theology alumni
Living people
Massachusetts Republicans
Religious leaders from Phoenix, Arizona
Seattle University alumni
Shareholder-rights activists
Stock and commodity market managers
Writers from Massachusetts